Homogamy may refer to:

Homogamy (biology), a term used in biology in 4 separate senses
Homogamy (sociology), marriage between individuals who are, in some culturally important way, similar to each other

See also
Cleistogamy
Endogamy
Heterogamy
Isogamy
Self-fertilization
Self-pollination